Mlađen Šljivančanin (born July 1. 1985) is a Serbian former professional basketball player.

Basketball career 
Šljivančanin played for Partizan and Spartak Subotica in the YUBA League, as well as Crvena zvezda, Radnički Belgrade and Borac Čačak in the Basketball League of Serbia. Also, with Crvena zvezda he played in the Adriatic League.

Šljivančanin spent a part of his career abroad and played in Germany, France, Russia, Cyprus and Romania. He played for Skyliners Frankfurt and RheinEnergie Köln in the Basketball Bundesliga. In the Russian Super League he played for VVS Samara, while in the French LNB Pro B he played for Bourg-en-Bresse. Šljivančanin played for Apollon Limassol and Keravnos in the Cyprus Basketball Division A. He finished his professional basketball career in the Romanian Liga I where he played for Timba Timișoara.

Personal life
Šljivančanin is a son of Veselin Šljivančanin (b. 1953), a former Montenegrin Serb officer in the Yugoslav People's Army (JNA) who participated in the Battle of Vukovar and was subsequently convicted on a war crimes indictment by the International Criminal Tribunal for the Former Yugoslavia for his role in the Vukovar massacre.

References

External links
 Profile at eurobasket.com

1985 births
Living people
ABA League players
Basketball players from Belgrade
Basketball League of Serbia players
BC Samara players
JL Bourg-en-Bresse players
KK Borac Čačak players
KK Crvena zvezda players
KK Partizan players
KK Spartak Subotica players
Keravnos B.C. players
Köln 99ers players
BKK Radnički players
Skyliners Frankfurt players
Small forwards
Serbian men's basketball players
Serbian expatriate basketball people in Cyprus
Serbian expatriate basketball people in France
Serbian expatriate basketball people in Germany
Serbian expatriate basketball people in Romania
Serbian expatriate basketball people in Russia